The 1902–03 Scottish Division One season was won by Hibernian by six points over nearest rival Dundee.

League table

Results

References 

 Scottish Football Archive

1902–03 Scottish Football League
Scottish Division One seasons
Scottish